Anti-Korean sentiment in China refers to opposition, hostility, hatred, distrust, fear, and general dislike of Korean people or culture in China. This is sometimes referred to in China as the xianhan (dislike of Korea) sentiment, which some have argued has been evoked by perceived Korean arrogance that has challenged the sense of superiority that the Chinese have traditionally associated with their 5,000-year-old civilization.

South Korea established official relations with the People's Republic of China in 1986, and relations between the two states have, for some time, slowly improved in order to allow more economic integration, but tension still exists between the two states.

Within the Chinese population, Korean culture has become popular in the 21st century. Amid a higher degree of interaction between the two countries in terms of politics and culture, however, there is still some looming anti-South Korean sentiment arising from various disputes between the two countries.

Pre-WWII History

During the Japanese colonization of Korea, there was an influx of Chinese immigrants, which, by 1925, reached 46,000. These immigrants, particularly the so-called coolies, became a source of anger for Koreans and were blamed for the country's labor environment problem such as low wages and employment instability. This was further aggravated by the Wanpaoshan Incident, a dispute between Chinese and Korean farmers in Manchuria. Fabricated reports of the incident published in Korea for Imperial Japanese propaganda efforts claimed that many Koreans were killed in the incident, and instigated strong public reaction in Korea that led to the anti-Chinese riots, which in turn caused large-scale anti-Korean protests in China in retaliation.

Historiographical disputes

Academic debates surrounding Goguryeo and Balhae have led to anti-Korean sentiments in China. Contentious topics in the debates include the ethnicity of the ruling class of both states and to which country should the histories of these states belong to.

Modern Sports

Football
Konghanzheng, a term coined by Chinese football fans, refers to a persistent phenomenon where the Chinese national football team has played about 30 matches against the South Korean national football team since 1978 but has never been able to beat them. Frustration has possibly led to several violent outbreaks against South Koreans in football games hosted in China, such as the Olympic preliminary match in 1999, friendship match in 2001, and another Olympics preliminary match in 2004.

In a Korea-China friendship football match held in Beijing, in 2000, South Korean spectators were violently beaten by Chinese spectators as the Chinese team lost. In 2004 during an Athens Olympics football preliminary match held in Changsha, Chinese spectators responded with violence as the Chinese team lost, resulting in the injury of one Korean spectator.

During the 2002 FIFA World Cup hosted in Korea and Japan, the incidents surrounding the Korean team's matches were well-known, and they would become a popular topic for some Chinese to bear sentiments of disapproval against South Korea, while certain Chinese media have reported negatively on the Korean side's demeanor. As the South Korean team progressed through the tournament to the semi-finals, it was evident that the South Korean team won surprisingly against strong European teams like Italy and Spain, because of unfair play and preferential treatment, due to a number of controversial judgments by the referees.

Anti-South Korean sentiment was also apparent among ordinary Chinese in China. It has been reported that ethnic Koreans in China were afraid of openly cheering for Korean teams due to hostility from local Chinese.

Baseball rivalry

	
Within the Republic of China animosity between Taiwanese and Koreans is present as a result of the rivalry between the two sovereign states in relation to baseball.
	
Although baseball is one of the most popular sports in Taiwan, Taiwanese baseball team have lost to South Korea at the international matches many times. This caused frustration and resentment towards South Korea among baseball fans. Taiwanese media made various controversial reports on South Korean baseball players; in one instance, the Taiwan edition of Now News called Shin-soo Choo, a then-Korean outfielder in the Cleveland Indians, Gaoli bangzi, a derogatory slur against Koreans. The slur was later removed, but not before South Korean media reported on it. Chinese Taipei baseball fans often refer to the South Korean baseball team as "" and Gaoli Bangzi, whilst verbal attacks against South Korean Major League players are also common.

2007 Asian Winter Games
During the 2007 Asian Winter Games held in Changchun, a group of South Korean athletes held up signs during the award ceremony which contained text that read "Mount Baekdu is our territory". Chinese sports officials delivered a letter of protest to criticize that those political activities violated the spirit of the Olympics. This incident has become a source for anti-Korea sentiment in China.

2008 Beijing Olympics

Those sentiments in China, along with similar anti-Chinese sentiments in Korea, became more prominent as a result of the 2008 Beijing Olympics. During the Seoul leg of the 2008 Olympic torch relay, Chinese students clashed with protesters. Numerous projectiles were thrown towards the South Korean protesters, injuring one newspaper reporter. Chinese supporters of the Beijing Olympics also engaged in mob violence, notably in the lobby of Seoul Plaza Hotel, against South Korean protesters, Tibetans, Western tourists, and police officers. This generated a strong statement of regret from the South Korean government to China and fanned a surge of anti-Chinese protests in Korean Internet portals.

Further controversy was generated when Seoul Broadcasting System (SBS) leaked footage of rehearsals of the 2008 Beijing Olympics opening ceremony. A Beijing Olympic official expressed his disappointment over the leakage. This incident has been widely reported in the Chinese media, as can be seen as the impetus to the dislike and distrust towards South Koreans amongst Chinese.

Throughout the events, the Chinese spectators often booed the South Korean athletes and cheered for competing nations and these even included Japan. These attitudes were widely reported within the South Korean media, however the issue which became the subject of most attention was that Chinese spectators chose to cheer for Japanese athletes when competing against South Korea, an action previously seen as taboo in earlier years as a result of Anti-Japanese sentiment in China. Analysts in China and abroad claim that Chinese are supporting Japanese players in return for their goodwill gestures towards China, noting a notable improvement in relations, which were previously mounted with arguments regarding topics such as World War II atrocities.

2018 FIFA World Cup qualification
During the 2018 FIFA World Cup qualification, anti-Korean sentiment exposed once again when South Korea and China faced each other in order to qualify for the 2018 FIFA World Cup. The sentiment came largely from the THAAD factor, when South Korea decided to install THAAD in the country, China viewed it as threatening its sovereignty, and unleashed anti-Korean boycott which led to the revival of anti-Korean sentiment in China. Thus, the World Cup match between two countries got huge attention, as China managed to overcome South Korea 1–0 in a match where police had been on high alert due to tensions between two countries.

2022 Winter Olympics
The 2022 Winter Olympics held in Beijing saw deterioration of relationship between China and South Korea. During the opening ceremony, China has raised a controversy among South Korean public as Hanbok was displayed during the ceremony. The display has caused uproar among South Korean public and politicians calling it "cultural appropriation". In solidarity, many South Korean celebrities uploaded a pictures of themselves wearing Hanbok, the movement draw ire among Chinese nationalists and began attacking the Korean celebrities on the internet.

Chinese diaspora and students
Another source of Anti-South Korean sentiment within China originates from reports by a number of overseas Chinese students in Korea, who experienced negative attitudes of local Koreans. It is reported that they are discriminated against based on the stereotype that they are uncivilised, poor, and ignorant by Koreans.

Huang Youfu, an ethnic Korean professor at the Minzu University of China noted that articles written by joseonjok about the discrimination in South Korea was a major source of anti-South Korean sentiment in China amongst netizens.

Contemporary cultural issues
In 2005, anti-South Korean sentiments in China became a major trend as China began disputing South Korea's attempts to register the Gangneung Danoje Festival as a UNESCO intangible cultural heritage. China claimed the Gangneung Danoje Festival derived from the Chinese Dragonboat Festival, and pursued a joint-registration of Gangneung Danoje Festival and Chinese Dragonboat Festival.

South Korea held the position that the Gangneung Danoje Festival is a unique cultural tradition of Gangneung, Korea, completely different from the Chinese Dragonboat Festival, and rejected Chinese contentions for joint-registration. Despite Chinese opposition, UNESCO has registered the Gangneung Danoje Festival as an intangible cultural heritage. Upon registration, the Chinese media began making accusations of South Korea stealing Chinese culture, and expressed regret and humiliation at losing Chinese Dragonboat Festival to South Korea.

The UNESCO intangible heritage controversy was followed by a series of similar accusations from the Chinese media and the Chinese internet. In 2007, rumors from the Chinese media that South Korea is attempting to register Chinese characters at UNESCO has generated significant controversy. These reports has also spread to Hong Kong and Taiwanese media.

Influenced by these issues, South Korea was elected as the most hated country in an internet survey on Chinese netizens, according to Chinese news in 2007. However, despite the internet debate, China's view of Korea is generally fine. One survey reports "good relations" reached 50.2% of the respondents, the "general" up to 40.8% while "an anti-Korean sentiment" of the small proportion of respondents was only 4.4 to 6.1%.

As a result of the anti-Korean sentiment in China, several Korean companies who have gained footholds in the country have also suffered. In June 2017, for instance, South Korean automaker Hyundai experienced a 64 percent drop in sales while its Kia division sustained a 58-percent decline. By 2018, the Lotte Group is also mulling the sale of its department stores in China blaming the persistent wave of anti-Korean backlash.

On 13 October 2020, RM, a member of the BTS, made a speech about the Korean War, where he told South Korea shared history of pains with the United States. This has caused uproar in China and Chinese-run media had rallied to lash out BTS for what they perceived as bias and denial of China's contribution and Chinese netizens have called to boycott anything Korea and Koreans, despite China fought against South Korea at the time.

See also
Anti-Chinese sentiment in Korea
 Voluntary Agency Network of Korea - It is a South Korean nationalist group that opposes "Chinese imperialism".
 Anti-Japanese sentiment in China
 Anti-Western sentiment in China
 Chinese nationalism
 Ethnic issues in China

References

Citations

Sources
 

Foreign relations of China
 
China–Korea relations
China–South Korea relations
Chinese nationalism
Racism in China